Café Point is a headland lying  south of Zapato Point and 2 nautical miles east of Nansen Island on the west coast of Graham Land. It was charted by the Belgian Antarctic Expedition under Gerlache 1897–99.   The name appears on an Argentine government chart of 1954.

References 

Headlands of Graham Land
Danco Coast